National Farmers Union (officially Farmers Educational and Cooperative Union of America) is a national federation of state Farmers Union organizations in the United States. The organization was founded in 1902 in Point, Texas, and is now headquartered in Washington, D.C. The organization protects and enhances the economic well-being and quality of life for family farmers, ranchers, and their rural communities. It does this by promoting legislation and education beneficial to farmers, and by developing cooperative buying and selling methods and businesses. The current president is Rob Larew, and the vice president is Jeff Kippley. Former NFU Presidents have included Roger Johnson, Tom Buis, and David Frederickson.

Today, National Farmers Union represents more than 200,000 family farms and ranches across the United States. There are organized chapters in 33 different states, and proposals are often started at the local level before moving up to the state and national levels. Once in the spring and once in the fall, leaders of NFU convene in Washington, D.C., to talk with legislators about solutions to problems they are facing.

NFU advocates sustainable production of food, fiber, feed, and fuel." They also state, "NFU will continue to be the respected, influential and independent national voice and coalition leader that bridges family producers and consumers on behalf of a vibrant and growing grassroots membership."

History
National Farmers Union was founded in 1902, and since then has strived to be politically involved in many issues. Years later, they formed their first marketing cooperative. In the early 1900's they campaigned for a parcel post system, direct election of senators, and voting rights for women. Their efforts also led to the enactment of the Federal Farm Loan Act. This act established twelve Federal Land Banks.

In 1931 the organization established the Farmers Union Central Exchange and in 1936 it promoted the Commodity Exchange Act. In 1934, it absorbed the once-powerful American Society of Equity. In 1943, NFU campaigned to make school lunches permanent, and two years later was a founding member of Cooperative for American Remittances to Europe (CARE). NFU once again made its mark on school lunches when it helped pass school milk legislation through Congress. 1954 also saw the organization fight for a refund of the federal gas tax for gasoline used for agricultural purposes.

In 1949 the NFU fought hard for the Brannan Plan which would provide generous subsidies to farmers, especially to those with smaller-than-average operations. All the other major farm groups opposed the Brannan Plan, and it never passed Congress.

In 1966, NFU worked to fight poverty by founding Green Thumb (now known as Experience Works), which secures employment for low-income and older workers. When efforts were made to eliminate the United States Department of Agriculture as a cabinet-level agency, NFU was successful in blocking these efforts.

During the 1970s, NFU took part in the development of rural health systems and was also included as part of the World Hunger Action Council. In 1980, the organization has also contributed to the process of passing a capital gains tax on foreigners who held US farmland.

In 1982, NFU participated in the process of getting a portion of the military budget shifted to humanitarian food aid using commodity surpluses from the US. In 1990, the organization pushed for increased regulation of and a national standard for organically-produced food. In 2002, NFU was among the leaders of a coalition of 165 farm and consumer groups that helped establish mandatory country-of-origin labeling. It took even more additional effort in order for the country-of-origin labeling to be officially implemented, and NFU led the charge. The labeling finally went into effect September 30, 2008, but is still being fought by multinational meat companies.

History of diversity, equity, and inclusion
Farmers Union has a long history regarding equality and opportunities for women. Unlike many organizations at the time, Farmers Union did not operate a separate women's auxiliary or distinguish membership of women differently from that of men. In 1908, the Pleasant Valley Union in Rooks County, Kansas elected Miss Amanda Bates as the first-known woman chapter president in Farmers Union history. This was more than a decade before the 19th Amendment to the U.S. Constitution granted women the right to vote. In 1925, the Alabama Farmers Union elected Ida Mathis to be the first state president in Farmers Union history. The first female to be elected to Wisconsin Farmers Union's board was Ruth Huntington of Mondovi, Wisconsin in 1952.

In 1930, National Farmers Union established a youth education program as women from across the U.S. pushed for formalized youth involvement in the organization.

In November 2017, the Wood-Portage-Waupaca County chapter of Wisconsin Farmers Union elected Alicia Razvi as the first Muslim county president in Farmers Union history.

Current activities

Renewable energy and the environment
National Farmers Union promotes renewable energy sources such as ethanol, biodiesel, and wind energy. They took part in the passing of the Renewable Fuel Standard (United States) in 2005. The organization has also been supportive of legislation promoting gas stations that carry E-85. The organization is in favor of an ethanol fuel tax incentive.

NFU is also working on a carbon credit program, which would allow farmers to earn income by storing carbon in their soil through “no-till crop production, conversion of cropland to grass, sustainable management of native rangelands and tree plantings”. In the program’s first two years of operation, it has earned over $8 million for participating producers.

Transportation
For transportation, NFU supports a system of waterways, railways, and roads that ensure the free flow of products to the market.” The organization also supports the continued expansion of telecom utilities into rural areas, as well as adequate health care, including increased funding for emergency response personnel and greater access to prescription drugs.

Economic policy
The organization opposes the privatization of Social Security, citing the fact that rural America is aging faster than the rest of the nation while economic growth has been significantly slower. NFU makes a distinction between "Free Trade" and "Fair Trade", and advocates for policies that protect family farms and ranches.

NFU supports Country-of-Origin Labeling (COOL). COOL was first passed in 2002 and then refined in 2008, mandates that muscle cuts of meat and some vegetables, nuts, and fruits sold at retail must contain a label informing consumers about the country where the product was sourced.

Taxes
Concerning tax policy, NFU opposes the flat tax. The organization is in favor of limited income tax refunds for lands used for agricultural purposes. NFU advocates for estate tax relief for family farms and ranches. As for the environmental concerns, NFU is in favor of the Safe Water Drinking Act, which would help protect groundwater in rural areas. It is also in favor of conservation, responsible use of public lands, responsible use of chemical agents, and protection of wildlife and endangered species.

Electoral politics
The election of Barack Obama in November 2008 was largely seen as a win for NFU, which had graded each of the candidates based on their policies. Obama received a perfect 100 percent rating, based on his support of the 2008 Farm Bill and a renewable fuel standard. On the other hand, the organization gave John McCain a grade of zero percent, in part because he was in favor of reducing subsidies for ethanol and food products. The NFU typically supports liberal policies, such as increased government and environmental regulation, anti-trust activities, and social safety net programs.

See also
Farmers' suicides in the United States

References

External links
National Farmers Union site
Iowa Farmers Union site
Minnesota Farmers Union site
North Dakota Farmers Union site
Pennsylvania Farmers Union site
South Dakota Farmers Union site
Texas Farmers Union site
Wisconsin Farmers Union site

1902 establishments in the United States
Agricultural organizations based in the United States
Farmers' organizations
Organizations established in 1902